Strwiąż ( translit. Stryvihor or Strv'iazh), is a river of Poland and Ukraine, a tributary of the Dniester. Its source is near the town of Ustrzyki Dolne, southeastern Poland. It crosses the Ukrainian border, flows through the town Khyriv and joins the Dniester south of the town Rudky.

Rivers of Lviv Oblast
Rivers of Podkarpackie Voivodeship
Rivers of Poland